Nicolás Ignacio Castillo Mora (born 14 February 1993) is a Chilean professional footballer.

Club career

Universidad Católica
Castillo was born and raised in Renca, suburb of the capital Santiago. During his childhood, he was part of Universidad Católica's supporter groups and later joined the club's youth ranks when he was 12.

In 2010, Castillo made a goalscorer debut against San Pedro de Atacama football team for a cup game, sealing a 10–0 thrash of Católica after scoring the tenth and last goal of it.

In 2011, Castillo debuted professionally in a league match against Cobreloa, coming on as an 84th-minute substitute during a 2–0 win. On 2 March 2012, he scored his first competitive goal in a 2–0 win over Rangers, again for a league match.

As a result of his performance in the 2013 FIFA U-20 World Cup, Castillo was linked with Premier League side Manchester United, where his compatriot Ángelo Henríquez was playing at the time. Despite the rumours surrounding his move, the transfer never materialised.

Club Brugge
In January 2014, Universidad Católica reached an agreement to sell Castillo to Belgian Pro League side Club Brugge. The move became official as Castillo signed for a fee of €3 million on a deal until 2018. He scored in his debut for Club Brugge in a 3–1 win over Genk on 9 February 2014. He struggled to score again but did so during the play-offs in the last game of the season against Zulte Waregem, with Brugge winning 2–0.

On 9 November 2014, Castillo netted a hat-trick in Brugge's 5–0 home win over Westerlo. On 28 January 2015, he was loaned to 1. FSV Mainz 05 until the end of the season, with an option to buy. On 7 April, having only made one substitute appearance for the Bundesliga club, he was ruled out for the remainder of the season with damage to his right knee ligaments.

Later, on 28 August 2015, Castillo joined Italian side Frosinone on loan from Club Brugge until the end of the season.

Pumas
In 2017, Castillo joined Mexican club Pumas UNAM, where he played for a year.

Benfica
On 4 June 2018, he was sold to Portuguese side Benfica, signing a five-year contract.

América
On 1 February 2019, Castillo returned to Mexico, joining Club América on a €7 million transfer fee, potentially rising to €9 million. Nine days later, he made his league debut as a second-half substitute in América's 3–0 loss to León at the Estadio Azteca.

Esporte Clube Juventude
On 26 August 2021, Castillo joined Brazilian side Esporte Clube Juventude on loan from América until the end of the season.

International career
Castillo was listed in the 21-man squad for the 2013 FIFA U-20 World Cup. In the tournament, he scored four goals, including an opener against Egypt, and was the top-scorer for Chile.

Castillo made his debut for the Chile senior team on 23 March 2013 in a 1–0 2014 FIFA World Cup qualification (CONMEBOL) away loss to Peru, coming on as a 70th-minute substitute for Jean Beausejour.

In 2016, Castillo was nominated for the 2016 Copa América squad and was part of the Chilean victory in the tournament. He was subbed in the 104th minute of the final against Argentina, which Chile won 4–2 on penalties, where he converted the 2nd spot kick.

Career statistics

Club

International

International goals
Scores and results list Chile's goal tally first.

Honours
Universidad Católica
 Primera División de Chile: Torneo Clausura 2015–16, Torneo Apertura 2016–17
 Copa Chile: 2011
 Supercopa de Chile: 2016

Club Brugge
 Belgian Cup: 2014–15

Benfica
 Primeira Liga: 2018–19

América
Copa MX: Clausura 2019
Campeón de Campeones: 2019

Chile
 Copa América: 2016

References

External links

 
 
 
 

1993 births
Living people
Footballers from Santiago
Association football forwards
Chilean footballers
Chile under-20 international footballers
Chile international footballers
Chilean Primera División players
Belgian Pro League players
Bundesliga players
Serie A players
Liga MX players
Primeira Liga players
Campeonato Brasileiro Série A players
Club Deportivo Universidad Católica footballers
Club Brugge KV players
1. FSV Mainz 05 players
Frosinone Calcio players
Club Universidad Nacional footballers
S.L. Benfica footballers
Club América footballers
Esporte Clube Juventude players
Club Necaxa footballers
Chilean expatriate footballers
Expatriate footballers in Belgium
Expatriate footballers in Germany
Expatriate footballers in Italy
Expatriate footballers in Mexico
Expatriate footballers in Portugal
Expatriate footballers in Brazil
Chilean expatriate sportspeople in Belgium
Chilean expatriate sportspeople in Germany
Chilean expatriate sportspeople in Italy
Chilean expatriate sportspeople in Mexico
Chilean expatriate sportspeople in Portugal
Chilean expatriate sportspeople in Brazil
Copa América Centenario players
2019 Copa América players
Copa América-winning players